Geneva Summit  may refer to
Geneva Summit (1955), a meeting of President Dwight D. Eisenhower of the United States, Prime Minister Anthony Eden of Britain, Premier Nikolai A. Bulganin of the Soviet Union, and Prime Minister Edgar Faure of France
Geneva Summit (1985), a meeting between US president Ronald Reagan and Soviet general secretary Mikhail Gorbachev
The 2021 Russia–United States summit, a meeting between US President Joe Biden and Russian President Vladimir Putin
Geneva Summit for Human Rights and Democracy

See also 
Geneva Conference (disambiguation)
Geneva Conventions